The PZL-Mielec M-18 Dromader (English: "Dromedary") is a single engine agricultural aircraft that is manufactured by PZL-Mielec in Poland. The aircraft is used mainly as a cropduster or firefighting machine.

Development
PZL-Mielec, then known as WSK-Mielec, began to design the Dromader in the mid 1970s, with help of United States aircraft manufacturer Rockwell International. PZL-Mielec asked for Rockwell's help because of the political situation at the time: operating in an Eastern Bloc country, PZL wanted the aircraft to sell well worldwide, and the company realized that certification by the United States Federal Aviation Administration would be important in reaching that goal. Rockwell on the other hand wanted to fit Polish high-power radial engines into its agricultural planes. As a result of this cooperation the Rockwell Thrush Commander aircraft was fitted with the PZL-3 engine, and the Polish designers created the higher payload M-18 Dromader by introducing the more powerful ASz-62 engine, making structural changes to the airframe, and increasing dimensions. The cooperation led to the Dromader sharing outer wing panels and part of the fuselage with the Thrush Commander.

The first prototype of the aircraft flew on August 27, 1976. In September 1978, the aircraft was given certification to fly in Poland. Certifications from many countries around the world followed soon.

Many aircraft of the M-18 type and its variations can still be seen around the world. They were sold to 24 countries, over 200 are used in the US. In 2008, fifteen were sold to China. In 2012, PZL-Mielec was still selling models M-18B and M-18BS, with 759 built in total. , the Dromader was sold by PZL-Mielec, but the production has been halted. The produced aircraft are still refurbished instead, with new engines (produced by WSK "PZL-Kalisz"). There are plans to acquire rights and renew the production in WZL-2 in Bydgoszcz.

Variants

M-18original one-seat production version,  available for special orders only.
M-18Atwo seater available from 1984 onwards. Allows a mechanic or chemical loader to be carried as a passenger to remote fields.
M-18AStwo-cockpit trainer version
M-18Brefined version of M-18A with increased capacity, flown in 1993.
M-18BStwo-cockpit trainer.
M-18Cversion with more powerful 895 kW (1,200 hp) Kalisz K-9 engine. Flown in 1995 but not produced.
M-18/T45 Turbine Dromaderturboprop powered with Pratt & Whitney Canada PT6A-45 engine. First flew in 1985 and was given FAA certification in April 1986.

M-21 Dromader Minismaller variant (1100 kg of chemicals), flown in 1982, not produced.
M-24 Dromader Superbigger variant (2000 kg of chemicals), flown in 1987, not produced.
M-25 Dromader Mikrosmaller variant (500 kg of chemicals), sketch only.
AII AVA-303The M-18 is being built in Iran as the AVA-303.

Operators

Military

Croatian Air Force - Former operator.

Hellenic Air Force

Montenegrin Air Force
 - Agricultural Aviation

Civil
The Dromader is in service with aerial agriculture and other companies in many countries, operating in a variety of roles. The former Yugoslav Airline, Jugoslovenski Aerotransport, used it for cropspraying.

Specifications (M18B Dromader)

See also

References

Jackson, Paul. Jane's All The World's Aircraft 2003–2004. Coulsdon, UK: Jane's Information Group, 2003. .
Taylor, Michael J. H. Brassey's World Aircraft & Systems Directory 1999/2000. London: Brassey's, 1999. .

External links 

 PZL-Mielec page
 PZL M21 Dromader Mini

M18
1970s Polish agricultural aircraft
Single-engined tractor aircraft
Low-wing aircraft
Aerial firefighting aircraft
Aircraft first flown in 1976